Capsule is a customer relationship management (CRM) software-as-a-service web application and mobile app developed by Zestia, a privately-held software company that operates globally and was founded in 2009.

History 
Capsule was released in 2009 originally under the name Javelin, before being renamed to Capsule in 2010.

In 2011, Capsule launched an integration with G Suite Marketplace.

In 2013, Capsule released Capsule for Mobile on the App Store and Play Store.

In 2018, Capsule released a Teams plan. The primary functions of the Teams plan are for businesses to assign responsibility for contacts, control access to data, and report on team performance.

Recognition 
 Winner – Best Entrepreneurial Tech Company in 2011 – Northern Tech Awards.
 Shortlisted – Best CRM for SMB – TechRadar Pro Best for Business Awards 2017
 Winner – Best CRM Solution – TechRadar Pro Best for Business Awards 2019: Best business software-as-a-service

See also 
 Comparison of CRM systems
 Comparison of mobile CRM systems

References

External links 
 

Customer relationship management software